Kopperapalem village is located in Prakasam district. Ballikurava is the mandal for Kopperapalem and 523302 is the Pin-code.

Geography
Kopperapalem is located on  (16.066800,80.012901).

Postal Head Office
Its Central Postal Office (Head Office) is situated in Santhamaguluru town.

Constituency
Kopperapalem belongs to Addanki Constituency.

Nearest Towns & Bus Routes
Nearest Towns from Kopperapalem are Santhamaguluru(), Ballikurava(), Narasaraopet(), 
Chilakaluripet(), Addanki().

 Bus Routes are also available from Addanki, Narasaraopet and from Chilakaluripet. 
Kopperapalem is 74 kilometres from the capital city Amaravathi village, Guntur district and 271 kilometers from Hyderabad City.

Nearest Railway Stations & Airports

Nearest Railway Stations
Narasaraopet - 
Chirala - 
Sattenapalli - 
Guntur - 
Piduguralla - 
Ongole -

Nearest Airport 
Nearest Airport - Vijayawada -

Nearest Place To Visit

Kotappakonda - 
Chirala - 
Guntur - 
Bapatla - 
Amaravathi village, Guntur district - 
Vijayawada - 
Nagarjunasagar - 
Srisailam - 
Tirupati -

Native Language
In Kopperapalem, Telugu is the local language.

Population
The total population of Kopperapalem is 2306. Males are 1,151 and females are 1,155 living in 543 Houses. The total area of Kopperapalem is 800 Hectares.

Temples & Festivals

Temples
In Kopperapalem village, Ramalayam Temple is the famous temple in surrounding areas. Also there is Hanuman Temple and Lord Ganesh Temple in this Village.

Education
There is Mandal Parishat Government School in this village.
Zillaparishat High School is located in Ballikurava.

Nearest Schools & Colleges 
 NTR Memorial School - Martur
 Kaakatheeya Vidya Peetam - Martur
 Oxford E.M School - Narasaraopet
 Krishnaveni Junior College - Narasaraopet
 Krishna Chaitanya Junior College - Narasaraopet

Nearest Engineering Colleges
 Narasaraopet Engineering College - Narasaraopet
 Tirumala Engineering College - Narasaraopet
 EVM College of Engineering & Technology - Narasaraopet
 Narasaraopet Institute of Technology - Kotappakonda
 Krishnaveni Engineering College for Women - Narasaraopet
 Eeswar College of Engineering - Narasaraopet
 Sri Mittapalli College of Engineering - Guntur
 RVR & JC College of Engineering - Guntur

Agriculture
Various crops grown in this village are listed below.

Sports
Cricket is the most popular game played here and also it is the most followed game than any other game.

References 

Villages in Prakasam district